Neil Doherty is an Irish radio presenter and producer, who has been employed by the National Irish broadcaster Raidió Teilifís Éireann (RTÉ) since 2010. He currently presents the weekend programme Saturday Sounds for RTÉ Radio 1 and since 2016 has been the Irish radio commentator for the Eurovision Song Contest, together with Zbyszek Zalinski.

References

External links
 Saturday Sounds with Neil Doherty

Living people
Year of birth missing (living people)
RTÉ Radio 1 presenters
RTÉ Radio presenters
Irish radio presenters
Irish radio producers